Baynard Castle may refer to:

Baynard Castle, Cottingham, East Riding of Yorkshire
Baynard's Castle, London